Brattain is a surname. Notable people with the surname include:

Robert Brattain (1911–2002), American physicist
Walter Houser Brattain (1902–1987), American physicist